Thunderheist was an electronic music duo from Toronto, Ontario and Montreal, Quebec in Canada. Thunderheist was made up of producer Graham Bertie (Grahmzilla) and Omolola Isis Salam (Isis). The two began collaborating before they had ever met in person, sending MP3 files to each other over the Internet.
They were signed to and released one album on Big Dada. Thunderheist was founded in 2005 by Graham as an anonymous dance music side-project to his more hip-hop leanings as Metrix. They became a duo in August 2006 when Graham inadvertently sent Omolola a remix he was working on for a Spank Rock remix competition and she recorded a rap over it. They've received moderate popularity for their track "Jerk It" featured in the 2008 film The Wrestler. Thunderheist was selected as the X3 Artist of the month by Aux.tv, CBC Radio 3 and Exclaim! Magazine for April 2009. Their self-titled full-length was released March 31, 2009. They were nominated for a 2010 Juno Award in the Dance Recording of the Year category.

In 2010, Thunderheist confirmed on their website that they had gone their separate ways.

Discography

Albums
 Thunderheist (March 31, 2009)

Singles
 "Bubblegum" (October 2007)
 "Jerk It" (July 2008)
 "Sweet 16" (2009)
 "Nothing 2 Step 2" (2009)
 "LBG (Little Booty Girl)" (November 2009)

References

Canadian electronic music groups
Canadian hip hop groups
Musical groups from Toronto
Musical groups established in 2005
2005 establishments in Canada
2010 disestablishments in Canada
Musical groups disestablished in 2010